The 2019–20 Dartmouth Big Green men's basketball team represented Dartmouth College in the 2019–20 NCAA Division I men's basketball season. The Big Green, led by fourth-year head coach David McLaughlin, played their home games at Leede Arena in Hanover, New Hampshire as members of the Ivy League. They finished the season 12–17, 5–9 in Ivy League play to finish in sixth place. They failed to qualify for the Ivy League tournament, although the tournament was ultimately cancelled due to the COVID-19 pandemic.

Previous season
The Big Green finished the 2018–19 season 11–19 overall, 2–12 in Ivy League play, to finish in eighth place, failing to qualify for the Ivy League tournament.

Roster

Schedule and results

|-
!colspan=12 style=| Non-conference regular season

|-
!colspan=9 style=| Ivy League regular season

|-

Source

References

Dartmouth Big Green men's basketball seasons
Dartmouth Big Green
Dartmouth Big Green men's basketball
Dartmouth Big Green men's basketball